Vettese is a surname. Notable people with the surname include:

 Father Don Vettese, founder of International Samaritan
 Peter-John Vettese
 Raymond Vettese, Scottish writer
 Adrian Vettese, Musician and Songwriter

See also
 Fettes (disambiguation)
 Fiddes